The Newaygo County Regional Educational Service Agency (NCRESA) is an Intermediate School District in Michigan serving the school districts that are primarily within Newaygo County. NCRESA provides services to six local public districts and five non-public schools within its boundaries. Directly or indirectly, NCRESA serves about 30 schools, with approximately 10,000 students.

Public School Districts
 Big Jackson School District
 Fremont Public School District
 Grant Public School District
 Hesperia Community Schools
 Newaygo Public School District
 White Cloud Public Schools

Non-Public Schools
 Cornerstone Christian Academy
 Faith Baptist Academy
 Fremont Christian School
 Grant Christian School
 Providence Christian High School

Other
 Newaygo County Career Technical Education Center

External links 
Newaygo County Regional Educational Service Agency

Intermediate school districts in Michigan
Education in Newaygo County, Michigan